Roberto Maehler (born 25 January 1985) is a Brazilian canoeist. He competed in the men's K-4 1000 metres event at the 2016 Summer Olympics.

References

External links
 

1985 births
Living people
Brazilian male canoeists
Olympic canoeists of Brazil
Canoeists at the 2016 Summer Olympics
Place of birth missing (living people)
Pan American Games medalists in canoeing
Pan American Games silver medalists for Brazil
Canoeists at the 2007 Pan American Games
Medalists at the 2007 Pan American Games
Canoeists at the 2011 Pan American Games
Medalists at the 2011 Pan American Games
Canoeists at the 2015 Pan American Games
Medalists at the 2015 Pan American Games
21st-century Brazilian people